Paolo "Paul" Zuccarelli (24 August 1886, Milan – 19 June 1913, Marcilly-la-Campagne, France) was an Italian racecar driver. Zuccarelli graduated in engineering in Brescia and took on racing shortly afterwards. In 1910 he moved to France. He was killed while testing a car prior to the 1913 French Grand Prix at Amiens.

Indy 500 results

References

1886 births
1913 deaths
Italian racing drivers
Indianapolis 500 drivers
Racing drivers who died while racing
Sport deaths in France